Audlem is a civil parish in Cheshire East, England. It contains 25 buildings that are recorded in the National Heritage List for England as designated listed buildings.  Of these, two are listed at Grade I, the highest grade, one is listed at Grade II*, the middle grade, and the others are at Grade II.  The major settlement in the parish is the village of Audlem.  In the village the listed buildings include churches and cemetery chapels, a former grammar school, a hotel, houses, and a memorial lamp standard.  In the surrounding countryside  the listed buildings include country houses, farmhouses, farm buildings, and a road bridge.  Running through the parish is the Shropshire Union Canal, and the listed structures associated with this are bridges, mileposts and a lock keeper's cottage.

Key

Buildings

See also
Listed buildings in Hankelow
Listed buildings in Buerton
Listed buildings in Adderley
Listed buildings in Dodcott cum Wilkesley
Listed buildings in Newhall

References
Citations

Sources

 

 

Listed buildings in the Borough of Cheshire East
Lists of listed buildings in Cheshire